Tuukka Tapio Mäkelä (5 September 1927 – 2 August 2005) was a Finnish sports shooter. He competed in the skeet event at the 1968 Summer Olympics.

References

External links
 

1927 births
2005 deaths
Finnish male sport shooters
Olympic shooters of Finland
Shooters at the 1968 Summer Olympics
Sportspeople from Pori